Onze sambas e uma capoeira is the first album by the samba composer Paulo Vanzolini. Released in 1967, it contains some successes of the composer, like 'Ronda' and 'Volta por cima', already recorded before by other artists. It counts with the participation of many artists, like Chico Buarque, Adauto Santos and Mauricy Moura, as singers, and Toquinho and Antônio Pôrto Filho, as arrangers.

Track listing

Personnel
Antonio Pecci Filho (Toquinho) - arrangement
Antônio Pôrto Filho (Portinho) - arrangement

References

1967 albums
Paulo Vanzolini albums
Samba albums